Płomień Sosnowiec is a men's volleyball club based in Sosnowiec in southern Poland, founded in 1992. The successor of Płomień Milowice. One time Polish Champion (1996) and two–time Polish Cup winner (2003, 2004).

In 2008, due to financial problems, the club had to withdraw from the highest level of the Polish Volleyball League.

Honours
 Polish Championship
Winners (1): 1995–96

 Polish Cup
Winners (2): 2002–03, 2003–04

Former names

References

Polish volleyball clubs
Sport in Silesian Voivodeship
Volleyball clubs established in 1992
1992 establishments in Poland